Corey Donald Woods (born December 7, 1978) is an American politician serving as the 33rd mayor of Tempe, Arizona since 2020. Woods is a member of the Democratic Party who previously served as a member of the Tempe City Council from 2008 to 2016, during this time he served as Tempe's Vice Mayor. He defeated incumbent mayor Mark Mitchell in 2020, becoming the city's first African-American mayor and Arizona's second.

References

21st-century American politicians
Living people
Mayors of Tempe, Arizona
African-American mayors in Arizona
1978 births
University of Michigan alumni
21st-century African-American politicians
20th-century African-American people